Milo Adventist Academy is a small private Adventist high school in the rural unincorporated community of Milo, Oregon, United States. It is a part of the Seventh-day Adventist education system, the world's second largest Christian school system. As Milo no longer has a post office, Milo Academy has a Days Creek mailing address. The only access to the school's campus is by the historical Milo Academy Bridge.

The school has been accredited by the Northwest Association of Accredited Schools since 1964.

See also

 List of Seventh-day Adventist secondary schools
 Seventh-day Adventist education

References

External links
 

Boarding schools in Oregon
Private high schools in Oregon
High schools in Douglas County, Oregon
Adventist secondary schools in the United States